The 2007 FIVB Volleyball Boys' Youth World Championship took place from 15 to 26 August in the Mexican cities of Tijuana and Mexicali, Baja California.

Competing nations
The following national teams have qualified:

Venues
Gimnasio de Usos Multiples (Tijuana) – Pool A, C, E, F
Auditorio del Estado (Mexicali) – Pool B, D, G, H

Round 1

Pool A

|}

|}

* Forfeit

Pool B

|}

|}

Pool C

|}

|}

Pool D

|}

|}

Round 2

Pool E

|}

|}

Pool F

|}

|}

Pool G

|}

|}

Pool H

|}

|}

Final round

Classification 13th–16th

|}

|}

Classification 9th–12th

|}

|}

Classification 5th–8th

|}

|}

Championship

|}

|}

Final standing

Team Roster
Mojtaba Shaban, Moein Rahimi, Hamed Bagherpour, Ashkan Derakhshan, Farhad Salafzoun, Edris Daneshfar, Farhad Ghaemi, Ebrahim Chabokian, Mojtaba Ghiasi, Amin Razavi, Golmohammad Sakhavi, Alireza Jadidi
Head Coach: Jovica Cvetković

Awards
MVP:  Mojtaba Ghiasi
Best Scorer:  Mandeep Singh
Best Spiker:  Huang Bin
Best Blocker:  Alireza Jadidi
Best Server:  Rolando Cepeda
Best Setter:  Nicolás Uriarte
Best Digger:  Erik Shoji
Best Receiver:  Dennis Del Valle

References

External links
 Official site

FIVB Volleyball Boys' U19 World Championship
World Championship
V
V
FIVB Boys Youth World Championship